The MLS Cup ring is an award in Major League Soccer given to the winners of the league's annual championship game, the MLS Cup. Since only one Philip F. Anschutz Trophy is awarded to the team (ownership) itself, the MLS Cup ring offers a collectible memento for the players and team management to keep for themselves to symbolize and recognize their victory. Awarding a ring is traditional in sports in North America, as opposed to the majority of the world where a medal would be award to each individual team member.

Details
These rings are typically made of silver or white gold with diamonds. They usually include the team name, crest, and MLS Cup winning year. Normally the rings are manufactured by Jostens, a sports memorabilia company, although the 2017 rings were made by Baron Jewelry.

Value and resale
Replicas and copies of MLS rings are seen as valuable to sports memorabilia and soccer communities. The 2015 MLS Cup ring awarded to the Portland Timbers had a special Timbers Army ring that sold for $5,000.

Most MLS Cup rings

See also
Championship ring
NBA Championship ring
Stanley Cup ring
World Series ring

References 

Championship rings
Championship ring
Championship ring